Visa requirements for Grenadian citizens are administrative entry restrictions imposed by the authorities of foreign states on citizens of Grenada.  Grenadian citizens had visa-free or visa on arrival access to 145 countries and territories, ranking the Grenadian passport 34th in the world in terms of travel freedom according to the Henley Passport Index.

Grenada signed a mutual visa waiver agreement with the European Union on 28 May 2015.

 Brunei, Dominica, Grenada, Mauritius, and the Seychelles are the only countries whose citizens may travel without a visa to China, Russia, the Schengen Area, and the United Kingdom.

Visa requirement map

Visa requirements 
Visa requirements for holders of normal passports traveling for tourist purposes:

Dependent, Disputed, or Restricted territories
Unrecognized or partially recognized countries

Dependent and autonomous territories

Other territories

Additional Rules

Visa exemption for Schengen States

Grenadian citizens are classified as 'Annex II' foreign nationals, and so are permitted to stay visa-free in the 26 member states of the Schengen Area as a whole — rather than each country individually — for a period not exceeding 3 months every 6 months.

Visa exemption in CARICOM States
Grenadian citizens wishing to live and work in another CARICOM State should obtain a CSME Skills Certificate. This must be presented at Immigration in the receiving country along with a valid passport and a police certificate of character. Holders of certificates are given a maximum of six (6) months stay in the host country until their status and documents could be verified. Additional documents are required if travelling with spouse and/or dependants such as Marriage certificate, Birth Certificate, etc.

Visa exemption in OECS States
Grenadian citizens can live and work in Antigua and Barbuda, Dominica, Saint Lucia, Saint Kitts and Nevis and Saint Vincent and the Grenadines as a result of right of freedom of movement granted in Article 12 of the Protocol of the Eastern Caribbean Economic Union of the Revised Treaty of Basseterre.

Visa exemption and requirements for the United Kingdom
Grenadian citizens are able to visit the United Kingdom for up to 6 months (or 3 months if they enter from the Republic of Ireland) without the need to apply for a visa as long as they fulfil all of the following criteria:
 they do not work during their stay in the UK
 they must not register a marriage or register a civil partnership during their stay in the UK
 they can present evidence of sufficient money to fund their stay in the UK (if requested by the border inspection officer)
 they intend to leave the UK at the end of their visit and can meet the cost of the return/onward journey
 they have completed a landing card and submitted it at passport control unless in direct transit to a destination outside the Common Travel Area
 if under the age of 18, they can demonstrate evidence of suitable care arrangements and parental (or guardian's) consent for their stay in the UK

However, even though, strictly speaking, he/she is not required to apply for a visa if he/she satisfies all of the above criteria, a Grenadian citizen who falls into any of the following categories has been strongly advised by the UK Border Agency (replaced by UK Visas and Immigration) to apply for a visa prior to travelling to the UK:
 he/she has any unspent criminal convictions in any country
 he/she has previously been refused or breached the terms of any entry to the UK, or been deported or otherwise removed from the UK
 he/she has previously applied for a visa and been refused one
 he/she has been warned by a UK official that he/she should obtain a visa before travelling to the UK

Grenadian citizens with a grandparent born either in the United Kingdom, Channel Islands or Isle of Man at any time or in the Republic of Ireland on or before 31 March 1922 can apply for UK Ancestry Entry Clearance, which enables them to work in the UK for 5 years, after which they can apply to settle indefinitely.

Remote work visas
Grenadian citizens can apply for a resident permit on the basis of a remote worker from the following countries:

Consular protection of Grenadian citizens abroad

Grenadian citizens who require consular assistance in a foreign country where there is no Grenadian foreign mission may be able to request assistance from a British Embassy, high commission or consulate. For example, Grenadians who need to travel urgently and whose passport has expired, been lost or stolen can be issued with an emergency travel document by a British foreign mission as long as this has cleared with the Grenadian Ministry of Foreign Affairs.
See List of diplomatic missions of Grenada.

See also

Visa policy of Grenada
Grenadian passport

References and Notes
References

Notes

Foreign relations of Grenada
Grenada